Central Oregon Community College is a community college in Bend, Oregon.

It primarily serves residents of Deschutes, Jefferson, and Crook Counties. Additionally its district includes portions of Klamath, Lake, and Wasco counties.

History
Central Oregon Community College is the oldest two-year college in the state of Oregon. The college was originally founded in 1949 making it almost a decade older than Clatsop Community College, the next oldest Community College in Oregon. The main campus is located on the west side of Bend, Oregon on 200-acres. The campus has a total of 26 different buildings, the most recently built being the residence hall in 2015. The location provides views of the Oregon Cascades, as well as access to much of what Bend has to offer. The main campus is located near the Deschutes National Forest and Shevlin Park providing access to miles of trails and outdoor recreation opportunities. Central Oregon Community College also has campuses in Redmond, Oregon, Prineville, Oregon, and Madras, Oregon providing educational opportunities across the Central Oregon Region.

Academics
Central Oregon Community College provides students the opportunity to pursue an Associates two-year degree or a Certificate. Programs will either prepare students to enter directly into the workforce or to continue their education as a transfer student to a four-year college for a Bachelor's degree. As of 2018, Central Oregon Community College offers 78 different academic programs, including programs like Automotive Technology, Aviation, Culinary Arts, Criminal Justice, Dentistry, Fire Science, Massage Therapy, Nursing, Outdoor Leadership, and Veterinarian. Outside of coursework, Central Oregon Community College also provides opportunities for students to become involved in clubs and activities. Clubs provide opportunities for students to become involved in groups focused on their area of study as well as become more involved with the student body. Students also have the opportunity to participate in sports.

Partnership with Oregon State University
Central Oregon Community College has a 2+2 partnership with Oregon State University Cascades Campus offering lower-division and prerequisite coursework that can be used toward the goal of earning a bachelor's degree. Starting Fall 2015, Oregon State University Cascades hosted its first freshman class of students seeking a bachelor's degree.

Notable faculty
Ray Hatton - geography professor, author, and long-distance runner
Ken Ruettgers - professional football player (an instructor)

See also 
 List of Oregon community colleges
 Central Oregon Community College Department of Public Safety

References

External links
Official website

Community colleges in Oregon
Universities and colleges accredited by the Northwest Commission on Colleges and Universities
Education in Deschutes County, Oregon
Education in Bend, Oregon
Buildings and structures in Deschutes County, Oregon
1949 establishments in Oregon
Educational institutions established in 1949